Snetterton Circuit is a motor racing course in Norfolk, England, originally opened in 1953. The circuit is named after the nearby village of Snetterton to the north-west of the circuit, although much of the circuit lies in the adjoining civil parish of Quidenham.

The circuit hosts races from series including the British Touring Car Championship, British Formula Three Championship and British Superbike Championship. From 1980 to 1994, the track hosted the UK's first 24-hour race, the Willhire 24 Hour. From 2003 to 2013 the Citroën 2CV 24 Hour Race was held at Snetterton on the 200 Circuit. After a short stint racing at Anglesey the 2CV 24Hr race has again returned to Snetterton and is usually held around the August bank holiday weekend.

Pre-racing history

Snetterton was originally an RAF airfield, RAF Snetterton Heath, later used by the United States Army Air Force. The airfield opened in May 1943 and closed in November 1948.

Racing history

After its use as a USAF base, in 1948 Snetterton Heath was returned to the local landowner, Fred Riches. Oliver Sear and Dudley Coram of the Aston Martin Owners Club (AMOC) approached Riches in early 1951 to suggest using the defunct airbase roadways as a circuit for club racing. Mr. Riches agreed, but, being a local churchwarden, only on condition that there was no racing between 10:45 am and noon on Sundays, and that all racing stopped before Evensong started, to avoid disturbing church services. The AMOC held the first open meeting on 27 October 1951, for what were dubbed "speed trials", but were actually a series of one lap sprint races. The first meeting was described by Motor Sport magazine as "an excellent event over an interesting new course." Fastest time of the day was set by Ken Wharton, driving ERA R11B, who averaged .

The circuit was first used for motorcycle racing in 1953, organised by the Snetterton Combine, an association of clubs in Norfolk and Suffolk.

The track was used by both Team Lotus (Formula One) and Norfolk Racing Co (Le Mans) to test their racing cars.

Sear corner was  further from Riches corner and led onto the "Norwich Straight" clearly visible in satellite maps and currently used by a Sunday market. The straight ended in a hairpin bend leading to Home Straight, which joined the existing track at the Esses, and is now a main access road for the circuit. Russell bend was added in the 1960s and named after Jim Russell who ran a racing drivers school at the circuit. Initially added to improve safety by slowing vehicles as they approached the pits, Russell bend was the scene of many accidents and was later altered to its present configuration.

Layout history

Circuit developments

In October 2005, Jonathan Palmer of MotorSport Vision, the owners of Snetterton Circuit, announced that the circuit would undergo extensive rebuilding work, in order to lengthen the circuit and improve its facilities.

On 23 September 2010, MSV announced that construction of the new infield section and track improvements would be finished in time for the 2011 motorsport season. The main development was the addition of a new one mile infield section, after Sear Corner, which was replaced and renamed Montreal, in deference to it being modelled on the Circuit Gilles Villeneuve hairpin. The final chicane before Senna Straight was also removed and replaced by an extension to Coram curve coupled with a new, tight, left-hand corner named Murrays. In addition to the track work, the redevelopment also improved spectator viewing and increased safety.

Snetterton 300 Circuit

The track incorporates much of the previous circuit with the infield section that was completed in 2011. The 300 track has been designed to bring international levels of racing to the circuit by gaining an FIA Grade 2 Licence. The layout also hosts major British motorsport championships. The British Formula 3 Championship and British GT Championship were the first of these to visit the new layout on 14 and 15 May 2011. The British Touring Car Championship with its ToCA support package also uses this layout, as does the British Superbike Championship. In 2016, ahead of Justin Wilson's 38th birthday, the Montreal hairpin was renamed Wilson, in memory of the Yorkshire IndyCar driver killed at the 2015 Pocono 500.

Snetterton 200
This layout is closest to the pre-2011 layout. The main differences between the original layout and the 200 layout are the re-profiled Justin Wilson, Coram, and Murray's corners, which have been designed to provide better opportunities for overtaking. This  layout is mainly used for club and local racing.

Snetterton 100
The 100 layout is made up solely of the new  infield section and is mainly used for testing and as a race school. Both the 100 layout and the 200 layout can be used simultaneously.

The first event which both events were used simultaneously was the BRSCC meeting held on the 29 and 30 May 2011. There was club racing on the outer circuit (VW Fun Cup, Saker Challenge, TVRs and Mighty Minis) and two rounds of the British Sprint Championship on the inner circuit.

Lap Records

Prior to the introduction of the 300 circuit in 2011, the official lap record stood at 56.095 set by Klaas Zwart, during a BRSCC meeting in August 2007. During the qualifying of this meeting, he set an unofficial lap record of 54.687.

The current 300 circuit lap record was set by Felipe Nasr from Brazil driving a Carlin prepared Dallara F308 in the 2nd race of the 2011 British F3 meeting. The fastest official race lap records at Snetterton Circuit are listed as:

Notes

References

External links

Snetterton Race Circuit web site.

Breckland District
Motorsport venues in England
Sports venues in Norfolk
Tourist attractions in Norfolk
Sports venues completed in 1953